Shirkuh-e Chahardeh (also Romanized as Shīrkūh-e Chahārdeh; also known as ShirKooh, Shīrkūh, Shīr Kūh, and Shirkukh) is a village in Chahardeh Rural District, in the Central District of Astaneh-ye Ashrafiyeh County, Gilan Province, Iran. At the 2006 census, its population was 999, in 323 families.

References 

Populated places in Astaneh-ye Ashrafiyeh County